Seán Masterson (born 27 January 1998) is an Irish rugby union player, currently playing for Pro14 and European Rugby Champions Cup side Connacht. He plays in the  flanker.

Connacht
Masterson made his senior competitive debut for Connacht in their 41–5 victory against Benetton in the 2018–19 Pro14 on 5 October 2019. Sean Masterson came on as a replacement in this match.

References

External links
itsrugby.co.uk Profile

1998 births
Living people
Irish rugby union players
Connacht Rugby players
Rugby union flankers